GCIRS 7 is a red supergiant located in the Galactic Center. It is very bright and is one of the largest stars currently discovered, with a size about 960 solar radii. If placed in the Solar System, its photosphere would nearly engulf the orbit of Jupiter.

References

Sagittarius (constellation)
M-type supergiants
J17454004-2900225
TIC objects